Adolfo Meléndez (2 June 1884 – 4 June 1968) was a Spanish military scientist who founded Real Madrid and then went on to become its president.

He served two terms as Real Madrid president. His first spell was between 1908 and July 1916, and his second spell was between 4 August 1936 and 27 November 1940.

References

1884 births
1968 deaths
People from A Coruña
Real Madrid CF presidents